Kerry George Pink  (born ) was a Tasmanian writer.

Pink was a journalist in Burnie with the Advocate in the north west of Tasmania for 40 years.

He wrote a number of histories about Western Tasmania and the north coast of Tasmania, and contributed the article on George Renison Bell published by the Australian Dictionary of Biography.

Pink's contribution to journalism was recognised by the award of the Medal of the Order of Australia in the 1995 Australia Day Honours.

Selected works
 
 
 
 
 *

Notes

Writers from Tasmania
Western Tasmania
1930s births
People from Burnie, Tasmania
Living people
Recipients of the Medal of the Order of Australia